Kargalybash (Qarğalıbaş) is a rural locality (a village) in Kargalinsky Selsoviet, Blagovarsky District, Bashkortostan, Russia.

Population 
The population was 199 as of 2010. There is 1 street.

Geography 
Kargalybash is located 33 km southwest of Yazykovo (the district's administrative centre) by road. Verkhniye Kargaly is the nearest rural locality.

References 

Rural localities in Blagovarsky District